Pawan Sharma (born  in 1959) is a senior leader of Bharatiya Janata Party and a former member of the Delhi Legislative Assembly. He was elected to the Delhi Assembly in 2013 from Uttam Nagar.

References

Living people
1959 births
Delhi MLAs 2013–2015
Place of birth missing (living people)
Bharatiya Janata Party politicians from Delhi